Alessandro Morris (born 22 August 1982) is a Caymanian cricketer. He played in the 2014 ICC World Cricket League Division Five tournament.

In August 2019, he was named as the captain of the Cayman Islands cricket team for the Regional Finals of the 2018–19 ICC T20 World Cup Americas Qualifier tournament. He made his T20I debut for the Cayman Islands against Canada on 18 August 2019.

References

External links
 

1982 births
Living people
Caymanian cricketers
Cayman Islands Twenty20 International cricketers
Place of birth missing (living people)